Hotel Riu Plaza Guadalajara is a skyscraper located in the city of Guadalajara, Jalisco, Mexico. At , it is the city and metropolitan area's tallest building and the fifth highest in Mexico.

Construction began in March 2009, and opened in June 2011. It has 44 habitable floors, holding 550 rooms, in addition to restaurants, meeting rooms and a 44th floor penthouse. On the roof is a heliport and maintenance rooms. A pinnacle rises above the top floor by adding  to the building height.

Construction history 

Its construction involved deep excavation, producing three basement floors and the foundation. Around the excavation was a retaining wall. This wall was made with steel and shotcrete.

The main materials were concrete, steel and glass. Its structure has columns and floor made from reinforced concrete and steel facade is formed of glass.

The Hotel is the second hotel in the chain built in a city, while others are beach resorts.

Fire 

On February 16, 2011, the hotel suffered two fires on floors 11 and 24, caused by an explosion in a LPG tank. Two workers were confirmed dead and 16 injured. Work on the hotel closed indefinitely. The fire did not damage the building's structure.

See also 

 List of tallest buildings in Mexico

References

External links
 

2011 establishments in Mexico
Buildings and structures in Guadalajara, Jalisco
Hotel buildings completed in 2011
Hotels established in 2011
Skyscraper hotels
Skyscrapers in Mexico